

Incumbents
President: Luis Guillermo Solís (until 8 May), Carlos Alvarado Quesada (starting 8 May)
First Vice President: Helio Fallas Venegas (until 8 May), Epsy Campbell Barr (starting 8 May)
Second Vice President: Ana Helena Chacón Echeverría (until 8 May), Marvin Rodríguez Cordero (starting 8 May)

Events

Births

Deaths

 
2010s in Costa Rica
Years of the 21st century in Costa Rica